Erigeron alpiniformis is a rare Arctic species of flowering plants in the family Asteraceae, and one of several plants known by the common name alpine fleabane. It has been found only in Greenland (Kalaallit Nunaat, part of Denmark) and in Labrador and Nunavut in Canada.

Erigeron alpiniformis is a short, branching shrub rarely more than 20 cm (8 inches) tall. The inflorescence generally consists of 1 or 2, rarely 3 or 4 flower heads, each head with many small yellow disc florets and surrounded by a ring of 100–200 white or pinkish-purple ray florets.

References

External links
Photo of herbarium specimen at Missouri Botanical Garden, collected in Greenland in 1926, isotype of Erigeron alpiniformis

alpiniformis
Flora of Nunavut
Flora of Labrador
Plants described in 1947
Flora of Greenland
Flora without expected TNC conservation status
Taxa named by Arthur Cronquist